Zooniverse is a citizen science web portal owned and operated by the Citizen Science Alliance. It is home to some of the Internet's largest, most popular and most successful citizen science projects. The organization grew from the original Galaxy Zoo project and now hosts dozens of projects which allow volunteers to participate in crowdsourced scientific research. It has headquarters at Oxford University and the Adler Planetarium. Unlike many early internet-based citizen science projects (such as SETI@home) which used spare computer processing power to analyse data, known as volunteer computing, Zooniverse projects require the active participation of human volunteers to complete research tasks. Projects have been drawn from disciplines including astronomy, ecology, cell biology, humanities, and climate science.

, the Zooniverse community consisted of more than 1 million registered volunteers. By March 2019, that number had reportedly risen to 1.6 million. The volunteers are often collectively referred to as "Zooites". The data collected from the various projects has led to the publication of more than 100 scientific papers. A daily news website called 'The Daily Zooniverse' provides information on the different projects under the Zooniverse umbrella, and has a presence on social media.

The principal investigator (P.I.) of the project, Chris Lintott, published a book called The Crowd & the Cosmos: Adventures in the Zooniverse.

Citizen Science Alliance
The Zooniverse is hosted by the Citizen Science Alliance, which is governed by a board of directors from seven institutions in the United Kingdom and the United States. The partners are the Adler Planetarium, Johns Hopkins University, University of Minnesota, National Maritime Museum, University of Nottingham, Oxford University and Vizzuality.

Projects

Art projects

Space projects

Nature and climate projects

Biology Projects

Humanities projects

Physics projects

Retired projects

Project Builder 
Zooniverse supports Project Builder, a tool that allows anyone to create their own project by uploading a dataset of images, video files or sound files. In Project Builder a Project Owner creates a workflow for the projects, a tutorial, a field guide and the talk forum of the Project and can add collaborators, researchers and moderators to their project. The moderators for example will have partial administrator rights in the talk, but cannot change anything concerning the workflow.

See also
Amateur exoplanet discoveries
9Spitch
AWI0005x3s
LSPM J0207+3331
Hanny's Voorwerp
Green Pea Galaxies
K2-138
PH1b
Stargazing Live
Tabby's Star

References

Science websites
Astronomy projects
Human-based computation
Citizen science
Internet properties established in 2009